Édgar Vicedo Ayala (born 24 August 1994) is a Spanish professional basketball player for Obradoiro CAB of the Liga ACB.

Career
After playing in the youth teams of Estudiantes, Vicedo made his debut in the Liga ACB in the first matchday of the 2012–13 season, where his club won by 101–86 to CB Canarias.

In February 2014, he was loaned to Peñas Huesca of the LEB Oro league until the end of the 2013–14 season. In Summer 2014, Vicedo was loaned again to Peñas, where he became the MVP of the round 21.

After 2014-15 season, his loan finished and he returned to Estudiantes.

On 15 October 2021 Vicedo signed with Fuenlabrada of the Liga ACB. In six games, he averaged three points and 1.7 rebounds per game. On 2 December Vicedo signed with Obradoiro CAB.

References

External links
 ACB.com profile
 FEB.es profile

1984 births
Living people
Basketball players from Madrid
CB Estudiantes players
CB Peñas Huesca players
Liga ACB players
Obradoiro CAB players
Small forwards
Spanish men's basketball players